Shear line may refer to:

 Shear line (locksmithing)
 Shear line (meteorology)